The National Police of Ecuador is the national police force and the main civil law enforcement agency of Ecuador. It is commanded by the Commanding General and subordinate to the Ministry of the Interior.

Controversies

Human rights
The United States Country Reports on Human Rights Practices has consistently identified major human rights abuses by Ecuadorian security forces, including: isolated unlawful killings and use of excessive force by security forces, sometimes with impunity, poor prison conditions, arbitrary arrest and detention, corruption and other abuses by security forces, a high number of pretrial detainees, and corruption and denial of due process within the judicial system. Members of the National Police have been accused of murder, attempted murder, rape, extortion, kidnappings, and alien smuggling.

Corruption
In a 2009 diplomatic cable from the United States diplomatic cables leak released by WikiLeaks and published by [El País] in April 2011, U.S. Ambassador Heather Hodges said that "corruption among Ecuadorian National Police officers is widespread and well-known" and that "U.S. investors are reluctant to risk their resources in Ecuador knowing that they could be targeted by corrupt law enforcement officials." The leaked cable resulted in a major diplomatic spat, resulting in the expulsion of U.S. Ambassador Hodges from Ecuador and the reciprocal expulsion of Ecuadorian Ambassador Luis Gallegos from the U.S.

See also 
2010 Ecuador crisis
 Crime in Ecuador

References

External links
 Official website

Law enforcement agencies of Ecuador
Ecuador